The Bari metropolitan railway service is a commuter rail service in the Italian city Bari. It consists of two lines, joining the central railway station, located in the city centre, with the dormitory suburb San Paolo (line FM1) and with the ″Karol Wojtyła″ Airport and the city of Bitonto (line FM2).

The system is operated by Ferrotramviaria. The national railway company Trenitalia also operates an urban railway service between Molfetta and Mola di Bari.

History 
The construction of a commuter railway to the dormitory suburb San Paolo was approved by Bari city council in 1999.

The railway line was opened on 24 June 2008, and after the test services was opened to the public service on 22 December.

On 20 July 2013 the new line FM2 to Bitonto, that also connects the ″Karol Wojtyła″ Airport, has been opened.

Lines being built

See also 
 List of Bari metropolitan railway stations

References

External links

 Official page of the operator company

Transport in Bari
Bari
Railway lines opened in 2008